Claude Auguste Lamy (15 June 1820 – 20 March 1878) was a French chemist who discovered the element thallium independently from William Crookes in 1862.

Life
Lamy was born in the commune of Ney in the department of Jura, France in 1820. He studied at the École Normale Supérieure, Paris. After he graduated from University in 1842 he became a teacher at Lille then at Limoges and again in Lille. In 1851 he received his Ph.D. In 1854 he became professor at the faculty of sciences of Lille (Université Lille Nord de France) and taught at École des arts industriels et des mines (École centrale de Lille). In 1866 he changed to the École Centrale des Arts et Manufactures (École centrale de Paris). Lamy died in 1878.

References

1820 births
1878 deaths
Discoverers of chemical elements
Academic staff of the Lille University of Science and Technology
19th-century  French physicists
19th-century  French chemists
Thallium